Return of the Funky Man is the second studio album by American hip hop recording artist Lord Finesse of Diggin' in the Crates Crew. It was released on February 11, 1992 via Warner Bros. subsidiary label Giant Records. Production was handled by seven record producers, including Diamond D, Showbiz, DJ Aladdin, SLJ, Latif, Petawane, and Lord Finesse himself. It also features guest appearances provided by A.G., Percee P, Harry-O and Shelrumble. The album peaked at number 95 on the US Billboard Top R&B/Hip-Hop Albums, and its self-titled single made it to number 13 on the Hot Rap Songs.

In 1991, Finesse split from his former partner DJ Mike Smooth and his former record label, Wild Pitch Records to release his first solo effort. Return of the Funky Man, which featured production from Finesse's partners Diamond D & Showbiz, and former Ice-T producers DJ Aladdin & SLJ. Finesse also produced his first beats on this album and would go on to become one of hip-hop's legendary producers. Finesse was signed to this Warner Bros. Records subsidiary because of Ice-T, who enjoyed a very positive relationship with the label, even through the controversy surrounding "Cop Killer", the notorious song by his heavy metal band Body Count. This album was the first cover shot by Danny Clinch.

Track listing

Album singles

Album chart positions

Singles chart positions

References

External links

Lord Finesse albums
1992 albums
Giant Records (Warner) albums
Albums produced by Diamond D
Albums produced by DJ Aladdin
Albums produced by Lord Finesse
Albums produced by Showbiz (producer)